Saint Göran Hospital (Swedish: Sankt Görans sjukhus) is a hospital in Stockholm, Sweden. It is located on Kungsholmen, a small island in the lake Mälaren in the city center.

St. Göran is one of Sweden's oldest hospitals. It was mentioned in letters from the 13th century. With Karolinska Hospital (Karolinska sjukhuset) it is Stockholms's main hospital and a primary trauma center.

Its name refers to Saint George (Sankt Göran in Swedish).

Staff 
Approximately 1,500 people work at the hospital, including 220 doctors, 560 nurses, and 350 assistant nurses.

Notable staff

 Dr. Ivan Osiier, Danish épée, foil, and sabre fencer, Olympic silver (épée), 25-time Danish champion

History 
The hospital was incorporated in 1994 and became Sweden's first privately owned emergency hospital in 1999.

External links
 
 

Hospitals in Stockholm
Hospitals established in the 13th century